National Highway 328A, commonly referred to as NH 328A is a national highway in India. It is a secondary route of National Highway 28.  NH-328A runs in the state of Uttar Pradesh in India.

Route 
NH328A connects Mehdawal, Khalilabad, Ghanghata, Ramnagar and Nyori in the state of Uttar Pradesh.

Junctions  
 
  Terminal near Mehdawal.
  near Khalilabad
  near Gagar Garh
  Terminal near Nyori.

See also 
 List of National Highways in India
 List of National Highways in India by state

References

External links 

 NH 328A on OpenStreetMap

National highways in India
National Highways in Uttar Pradesh